Bell Canyon is an unincorporated community in eastern Ventura County, California, United States. Bell Canyon is a gated community in the Simi Hills with the main access through the Los Angeles community of West Hills and the western San Fernando Valley. The 2010 United States census reported Bell Canyon's population was 2,049. For statistical purposes, the United States Census Bureau has defined Bell Canyon as a census-designated place (CDP). According to a 2016 study, Bell Canyon is the seventh wealthiest community in the state of California with an annual median income of $230,000. Incomes are commonly upwards of millions of dollars a year.

History

Pre-20th century
Chumash Native Americans lived in the canyon for around 8,000 years B.P.  The Chumash had the village of Hu'wam here in the canyon on Bell Creek upstream from Escorpión Peak. It was multi-cultural, where Chumash, Tongva, and Tataviam peoples lived and traded together. Nearby is the Burro Flats Painted Cave. Escorpión Peak (aka: Castle Peak) is one of nine alignment points in Chumash territory and is considered essential to maintaining the balance of the natural world.

In 1845 the Mexican land grant for Rancho El Escorpión, named for the peak and located beside it at the mouth of Bell Canyon, was given by Mexican Governor Pío Pico. Chumash-Ventureño Chief Odón Eusebia (1795–), his brother-in-law Urbano, and Urbano's son Mañuel were the grantees of the Rancho grant, formerly Mission San Fernando Rey de España (Mission San Fernando) lands. After California U.S. statehood, as required by the Land Act of 1851, a claim for Rancho El Escorpión was filed with the United States Public Land Commission in 1852, and the grant was patented to Odón Eusebia, Urbano, and Mañuel in 1876. In 1871, Miguel Leonis acquired Odón Eusebia's holdings of Rancho El Escorpión, along with an adobe on the adjacent southern ranch lands in Calabasas.  He used the land for cattle and sheep herds. Through various landowners that use continued at the Rancho until 1959 and Bell Canyon until 1967.

20th century - onward
In 1967 the Spruce Land Corporation and Boise Cascade joined in a partnership to purchase the Bell Canyon area to develop the community of Bell Canyon. In the fall of 1968, the Bell Canyon Equestrian Center, designed by 'Southern California modern ranch style' architect Cliff May, was built and began operation. In 1969 a new subdivision called "Woodland Hills Country Estates" was developed and opened for sales. It was a success, selling nearly all the 800 home site lots within ten days. In the fall of 1969 the new residential property owners took leadership of the community association and renamed the development "Bell Canyon," after Charles A. Bell, the original homesteader here and son of pioneer Horace Bell. He was a leading late 1880s newspaper publisher, Los Angeles attorney winning many cases for clients against neighbor Miguel Leonis, and the 1906 Justice of the Peace for Calabasas. Legend says he lost a right arm in an 1887 shootout when raiding a moonshiner. The Rancho El Escorpión compound adobes, from the 1840s to the 1960s at the mouth of Bell Canyon, were actually outside the land grant and on Bell's property.

Geography and environment
Bell Creek, a tributary to the headwaters of the Los Angeles River, winds its way through the community. Bell Canyon is an important part of the crucial Simi Hills Wildlife corridor linking migrations between the Santa Monica Mountains and Santa Susana Mountains.

There are many hiking and riding trails around the community, some of which border the Upper Las Virgenes Canyon Open Space Preserve Park connecting to the south and west.

Demographics

The 2010 United States Census reported that Bell Canyon had a population of 2,049. The racial makeup of Bell Canyon was 1,724 (84.1%) White, 58 (2.8%) African American, 4 (0.2%) Native American, 179 (8.7%) Asian, 0 (0.0%) Pacific Islander, 10 (0.5%) from other races, and 74 (3.6%) from two or more races. Hispanic or Latino of any race were 103 persons (5.0%).

The Census reported that 2,049 people (100% of the population) lived in households, 0 (0%) lived in non-institutionalized group quarters, and 0 (0%) were institutionalized.

There were 661 households, out of which 286 (43.3%) had children under the age of 18 living in them, 533 (80.6%) were heterosexual married couples living together, 40 (6.1%) had a female householder with no husband present, 19 (2.9%) had a male householder with no wife present.  There were 15 (2.3%) unmarried heterosexual partnerships, and 8 (1.2%) same-sex married couples or partnerships. 45 households (6.8%) were made up of individuals, and 15 (2.3%) had someone living alone who was 65 years of age or older. The average household size was 3.10.  There were 592 families (89.6% of all households); the average family size was 3.23.

The population was spread out, with 521 people (25.4%) under the age of 18, 152 people (7.4%) aged 18 to 24, 287 people (14.0%) aged 25 to 44, 839 people (40.9%) aged 45 to 64, and 250 people (12.2%) who were 65 years of age or older.  The median age was 46.5 years. For every 100 females, there were 101.1 males.  For every 100 females age 18 and over, there were 98.7 males.

The homeowner vacancy rate was 1.7%; the rental vacancy rate was 5.7%.  1,933 people (94.3% of the population) lived in owner-occupied housing units and 116 people (5.7%) lived in rental housing units.

Government
The Bell Canyon Community Services District, an independent government agency provides services such as waste removal, community recreation programs and security services to the residents in its boundaries. The independent government agency was established in 1984.

Education
Bell Canyon is served by the Las Virgenes Unified School District, with students bused each day to attend the schools of Round Meadow Elementary School, Alice C. Stelle Middle School, and Calabasas High School.

Notable people

 John Aniston, actor (1933-2022)
 Roger Arnebergh, Los Angeles City Attorney (1910–2004)
 Guy Bee, television director, television producer, steadicam operator (1961- )
 Matt Earl Beesley, television director (1953- )
 Shelley Berman, comedian (1925–2017)
 Jonathan Butler, musician (1961- )
 Bruce Campbell, actor (1958- )
 José Canseco, baseball player (1964- )
 Scott Carpenter, astronaut (1925–2013)
 Katie Cassidy, musician/actress (1986- )
 Holly Marie Combs, actress (1973- )
 Micky Dolenz, musician (1945- )
 Roxann Dawson, actress (1958- )
 Stuart Duncan, CEO, founder, TEN Broadcasting Inc. (1956- )
 Bobbie Eakes, actress (1961- )
 Jeff Eastin, television producer, screenwriter (1967- )
 Elliot Easton, musician (1953- )
 Kevin Eubanks, jazz musician (1957- )
 Cory Everson, bodybuilder/actress (1959- )
 Jamie Farr, actor (1934- )
 Lyndsy Fonseca, actress (1987- )
 Ryan Friedlinghaus, MTV's Pimp My Ride, C.E.O. of West Coast Customs
 Snuff Garrett, record producer (1938–2015 )
 Mike Garson, pianist (1945- )
 Kathy Garver, actress (1945- )
 Floyd Gaugh, musician (1967- )
 Bruce Hall, musician (1953- )
 Butch Hartman, animator (1965- )
 Don Herbert, "Mr. Wizard": scientist (1917–2007)
 Ernie Hudson, actor (1945- )
 Alex Katunich, musician (1976- )
 Paul Leonard-Morgan, composer (1974- )
 Pattie Mallette, Canadian author
 Sam McMurray, actor (1952- )
 John McVie, musician (1945- )
 Alyssa Milano, actress (1972- )
 Erin Murphy, actress (1964- )
 Niecy Nash, comedian/actress (1970- )
 Vince Neil, musician (1961- )
 Melissa Reeves, actress (1967- )
 Scott Reeves, actor/musician (1966- )
 Joe Rogan, actor, comedian, commentator, game show host (1967-)
 RZA, rapper, music producer (1969- )
 Kenny Wayne Shepherd, musician (1977- )
 Al Schmitt, recording engineer (1930-2021)
 T.T. Boy, actor (1968- )
 Trey Songz, R&B/Hip Hop Artist (1984- )
 Marc Summers, game show host (1951- )
 Larry Wilcox, actor (1947- )

See also
 Ranchos of California
 Upper Las Virgenes Canyon Open Space Preserve
 Bell Creek

References

External links
 
 CSUN Oviatt Library Digital Collections Rancho El Escorpión vintage photographs website.

Census-designated places in Ventura County, California
Populated places established in 1969
Gated communities in California
Simi Hills
Census-designated places in California